Sendo Z100 is a Tri-band phone by Sendo, designed in 2002 and never launched as Sendo sued Microsoft.

Background
After Microsoft bought shares of Sendo, they started together to develop the new devices operating system called Stinger.

Microsoft and Sendo showed a first prototype at the  3GSM World Congress in Cannes in February 2001. The Sendo Z100 was the first prototype implementation of the renamed operating system Smartphone 2002 presented at the CeBIT 2002.

Because the phone was multiple times announced and shunted to new release dates, Sendo canceled the phone in November 2002. Although Sendo didn't give an official reason for cancelling the launch of the Z100, the company had been promised an exclusive by Microsoft, however, Microsoft had also approached HTC to make a competing device which was launched by Orange in the UK as the Orange SPV in November 2002. This later led to a lawsuit between Sendo and Microsoft which ended with an out of court settlement that required all Z100s manufactured to date be destroyed. Sendo announced that the Series 60 platform would be used for future phones.

Other technical specifications
Speakerphone	Yes
MEMORY	Phonebook
Call records
DATA	GPRS	Yes
Bluetooth	No 
Messaging	SMS
Browser Yes
 Streaming video Yes
Clock	No
Alarm	Yes
Games	Yes
Java	Yes
mobile Internet with Pocket Internet Explorer
Organizer
Voice dial
Voice memo

References

External links
 Sendo Z100 information

Z100
Windows Mobile Standard devices